The United States competed at the 2007 World Championships in Athletics.

Events

Men

100 m

200 m

400 m

800 m

1500 m

5000 m

10000 m

Marathon

3000 m Steeplechase

20 km Walk

50 km Walk

110 m Hurdles

400 m Hurdles

Relay

Relay

High Jump

Pole Vault

Long Jump

Triple Jump

Shot Put

Discus

Hammer Throw

Javelin

Decathlon

Women

100 m

200 m

400 m

800 m

1500 m

5000 m

10000 m

Marathon

3000 m Steeplechase

20 km Walk

100 m Hurdles

400 m Hurdles

Relay

Relay

High Jump

Pole Value

Long Jump

Triple Jump

Shot Put

Discus

Hammer Throw

Javelin

Heptathlon

References

Nations at the 2007 World Championships in Athletics
World Championships in Athletics
2007